Muskett is a surname. Notable people with the surname include:

Alice Jane Muskett (1869–1936), Australian painter and writer
Arthur Edmund Muskett (1900–1984), British botanist and mycologist
Emily Muskett (born 1989), British weightlifter
Jennie Muskett, British television composer
Netta Muskett (1887–1963), English writer
Philip E. Muskett (1857–1909), Australian physician and health reformer

See also
Hunter Muskett, an English folk rock band
Musket, a type of firearm